A bone folder, bonefolder, or folding bone is a dull-edged hand tool used to fold and crease material in crafts such as bookbinding, cardmaking, origami, and other paper crafts  that require a sharp crease or fold. The tool was also used when correspondence by letter writing was more formal and an art.

Bone folders may be made from the leg bone of a cow, deer, or similar animal; ivory; or plastic. Those made from bone may be less likely to leave residue on the workpiece.

In Japan, the equivalent folding tool is traditionally made from bamboo, although alternatives include a Japanese fabric marking tool (hera) and a Western bone folder.

See also 
 Bone tool

References

Book arts
Bookbinding
folder